Brother's Keeper is a 1992 documentary directed by Joe Berlinger and Bruce Sinofsky.  The film is about an alleged 1990 murder in the village of Munnsville, New York. The film is in the "Direct Cinema" style of the Maysles brothers, who had formerly employed Berlinger and Sinofsky.

Summary
The film contrasts two groups of society: people from rural areas and those from larger cities. It also shows how the media flocked to the town to cover the story.

This film displays two completely opposite views of the Ward brothers. One opinion is that of the locals, who defend the Ward brothers as simple country folk. The other is that of the press, who stereotype the brothers as poor, uneducated hill people.

The Ward sister was not featured in this film because of her death in the 1980s. However, her daughter Pat makes an appearance in the DVD's special features.

Production
After its theatrical run, Brother's Keeper aired on PBS as part of the series American Playhouse.

The Ward Boys
In a rural farming community near Utica, New York, four brothers lived in a dilapidated house. The brothers were Roscoe (July 23, 1919 – June 23, 2007), Lyman George (July 7, 1923 – August 15, 2007), William Jay (July 10, 1926 – June 6, 1990), and Adelbert Daniel (known as Delbert) (October 5, 1930 – August 6, 1998). The men were barely literate, had no formal education, and farmed land that had been in their family for generations.

William's death
William Ward, who had been ill for years, was found dead one morning.  Delbert was accused of killing him, perhaps by smothering. The prosecution's theory at trial was that Delbert had performed a mercy killing in order to put William out of his misery after a period of severe headaches and declining health. As the film progresses, it is revealed that during the coroner's examination of William's body, semen was found on clothing and on William's leg, leading to the suggestion that Delbert had killed William in an episode of "sex gone bad." The film never follows up on this media sensation.

Delbert Ward was acquitted at trial, largely because the lack of any physical evidence and that the New York State Police violated Delbert's rights by coercing a confession (which he later retracted) and by having him sign a written statement which he could not understand due to illiteracy.

The brothers' fates
Delbert Ward died at age 67 at Bassett Hospital in Cooperstown, New York on August 6, 1998.

Roscoe Ward died at age 88 on June 23, 2007.

Lyman Ward died at age 85 in Utica, New York on August 15, 2007.

Accolades

Wins
Directors Guild of America, USA: DGA Award for Outstanding Directorial Achievement in Documentary/Actuality
National Board of Review, USA: NBR Award for Best Documentary
New York Film Critics Circle Awards: NYFCC Award for Best Documentary
Sundance Film Festival: Audience Award for Documentary

Nominations
Sundance Film Festival: Grand Jury Prize for Documentary

References

External links 
 
 Brother's Keeper on AllMovie
 

1992 documentary films
1992 films
American documentary films
Documentary films about crime in the United States
Documentary films about death
Madison County, New York
Documentary films about the media
American Playhouse
Films about brothers
Films directed by Joe Berlinger
Films produced by Joe Berlinger
Films directed by Bruce Sinofsky
Films set in New York (state)
1990s English-language films
1990s American films